This is the results breakdown of the local elections held in Castile and León on 27 May 2007. The following tables show detailed results in the autonomous community's most populous municipalities, sorted alphabetically.

City control
The following table lists party control in the most populous municipalities, including provincial capitals (shown in bold). Gains for a party are displayed with the cell's background shaded in that party's colour.

Municipalities

Ávila
Population: 53,272

Burgos
Population: 173,676

León
Population: 136,985

Palencia
Population: 82,263

Ponferrada
Population: 66,656

Salamanca
Population: 159,754

Segovia
Population: 55,476

Soria
Population: 38,004

Valladolid
Population: 319,943

Zamora
Population: 66,135

See also
2007 Castilian-Leonese regional election

References

Castile and León
2007